Selenophorus fossulatus is a species of ground beetle in the family Carabidae. It is found in North America.

References

Further reading

 

Harpalinae
Beetles of North America
Beetles described in 1829
Taxa named by Pierre François Marie Auguste Dejean
Articles created by Qbugbot